
A constituency Labour Party (CLP) is an organisation of members of the British Labour Party who live in a particular  parliamentary constituency.

In England and Wales, CLP boundaries coincide with those for UK parliamentary constituencies. In Scotland, CLP boundaries align with constituencies of the Scottish Parliament. The Labour Party in Northern Ireland has, since February 2009, been organised as a province-wide constituency Labour Party which is yet to contest elections. Labour International is a CLP for members of the British Labour Party who are currently living overseas.

For much of the Labour Party's history, especially during the 1980s, CLPs were perceived as relatively left wing, compared to the more moderate or pragmatic trade unions.

Bodies 
A CLP's main decision-making body is normally its General Committee or All Member Meeting. Day-to-day management is generally carried out by the executive committee (EC).

Officers
The Labour Party Rule Book establishes the CLP officers as chair, vice-chair/campaigns, vice-chair/membership, secretary, treasurer and women's officer. These officers are referred to as the Key Officers.

CLPs may appoint additional "functional officers" such as a Youth Officer, BAME Officer, LGBT+ Officer, Disability Officer, Political Education and Training Officer, Trade Union Liaison Officer (TULO), Business Liaison Officer (BuLO), Information Technology Officer and Fundraising Officer who may attend meetings of the executive committee (without voting power).

The CLP elects representatives to national Party structures, including delegates to Labour Party Conference, and it nominates candidates for election to other Party positions such as the National Policy Forum and the National Executive Committee, as well as Party structures within Scotland, Wales or the appropriate English region.

Meetings
In 2004, the Labour Party carried out the "21st Century Party" review. As a result, some CLPs chose to change their arrangements. Some CLPs have merged the GC and EC into a single committee, whilst some CLPs have abolished the GC entirely and organize all-member meetings to take decisions. Other CLPs, particularly in urban areas divided between a number of constituencies, have chosen to combine their activities with neighbouring CLPs.

CLP committees generally meet on a monthly basis: some have chosen to meet less frequently and to organise all-member meetings or policy forums in intervening months. Changes to the standard model of operation for CLPs require permission from the Party's National Executive Committee: however, this practice can be devolved to National or Regional (paid) Officers of the Party.

Local campaign forums
CLPs also elect representative to local campaign forums (LCFs) which promote the election of Labour councillors and then oversee the work of Labour councillors on a specific principal local authority. LCFs replaced local government committees in Autumn 2011 as part of the Labour Party's Refounding Labour agenda. Where the boundaries of a local authority are the same as those used for a parliamentary constituency, the GC will also assume the role of LCF.

The LCF may be referred to in some areas by the older title of district Labour party (DLP) where it is overseeing a district council and county Labour party where it is overseeing the work of a shire county council.

Selection of parliamentary candidates
Functions of the CLP include selecting the local Labour Party candidate for a national parliamentary General Election.

Where there is a sitting Labour MP, the CLP can organise a 'trigger ballot' to decide whether it wishes to carry out the full selection procedure outlined below or simply endorse the sitting MP as their candidate at the next election. It is unusual for a sitting MP to 'lose' their trigger ballot, which requires the endorsement of one third of party branches or one third of affiliated branches to succeed.

In the event that the MP is not a Labour MP, or the sitting MP is retiring or has lost their trigger ballot, a full selection is held. The CLP must, for this, follow the procedures agreed by the National Executive Committee, including whether or not the selection will be carried out from an open or all-women shortlist.

The CLP can choose whether or not to select a candidate on the Labour Party's panel of approved candidates. However, should the CLP select a candidate not on the panel, its decision is subject to the National Executive Committee retrospectively satisfying itself that the candidate reaches the standard required to join the panel. In this and other circumstances (for example new information emerging about a candidate subsequent to their selection), the National Executive Committee can exercise its power to block a CLP's initial choice, which has on occasion proved controversial. In May 2022, all members of the executive committee of the Wakefield CLP resigned after their chosen candidates were all denied approval.

See also
 Conservative Association

References

External links
Labour Party A–Z jargon-buster United the Union

Organisation of the Labour Party (UK)